Oak Hill is a village in Jackson County, Ohio, United States. The population was 1,551 at the 2010 census.

History 
Oak Hill was also a stop on Morgan's Raid, led by Confederate Brigadier General John Hunt Morgan during the American Civil War.  Oak Hill was settled by Welsh immigrants that had been stranded on the Ohio River in Gallipolis.

Nineteenth-century events

1814 - First settler, Peter Seel
1818 - First Welsh settlers
1819 - Organization of the Union Baptist Church
1835 - Organization of the Moriah "Mother Church"
1837 - Establishment of the post office
1837 - Organization of Horeb Church
1839 - Beginning of Welsh immigration
1841 - Organization of Bethel Church
1841 - Organization of Congregational Church
1843 - Organization of Sardis Church
1843 - Organization of the Welsh Calvinistic Methodist Church (United Presbyterian Church)
1853 - Construction of Jefferson Furnace
1856 - Organization of Gallia Baptist Church
1866 - Establishment of Portland Masonic Lodge No. 366
1873 - Incorporation of the village
1880 - Creation of the Oak Hill Morgan Academy
1881 - First Newspaper Created 
1891 - Creation of the Farmers' Bank
1873 - Incorporation of the Aetna Fire Brick and Coal Company
1873 - Incorporation of the Oak Hill Fire Brick Company
1898 - Incorporation of the Ohio Fire Brick Company
1893 - Formation of the Oak Hill Local Union School District

Geography
Oak Hill is located at  (38.896514, -82.570649).

Demographics

2010 census
As of the census of 2010, there were 1,551 people, 624 households, and 386 families living in the village. The racial makeup of the village was 97.5% White, 0.5% African American, 0.2% Native American, 0.3% Asian, and 1.6% from two or more races. Hispanic or Latino of any race were 0.3% of the population.

As of 2010 the largest self-identified ancestry/ethnic groups in Oak Hill were: 
American 12.8%
German 10.8%
Welsh 10.3%
Irish 5.7%
English 5.4%
French 1.2%
Scots-Irish 1.1%

There were 624 households, of which 32.1% had children under the age of 18 living with them, 43.8% were married couples living together, 14.1% had a female householder with no husband present, 4.0% had a male householder with no wife present, and 38.1% were non-families. 31.4% of all households were made up of individuals, and 15.8% had someone living alone who was 65 years of age or older. The average household size was 2.49 and the average family size was 3.12.

The median age in the village was 36.3 years. 25.2% of residents were under the age of 18; 10% were between the ages of 18 and 24; 24.4% were from 25 to 44; 25.4% were from 45 to 64; and 15% were 65 years of age or older. The gender makeup of the village was 47.6% male and 52.4% female.

2000 census
As of the census of 2000, there were 1,685 people, 673 households, and 458 families living in the village. The population density was 1,474.5 people per square mile (570.7/km). There were 739 housing units at an average density of 646.7 per square mile (250.3/km). The racial makeup of the village was 98.28% White, 0.24% African American, 0.42% Native American, 0.24% Asian, 0.12% from other races, and 0.71% from two or more races. Hispanic or Latino of any race were 0.12% of the population.

There were 673 households, out of which 34.3% had children under the age of 18 living with them, 49.2% were married couples living together, 14.6% had a female householder with no husband present, and 31.8% were non-families. 27.8% of all households were made up of individuals, and 13.7% had someone living alone who was 65 years of age or older. The average household size was 2.44 and the average family size was 2.95.

In the village, the population was spread out, with 25.3% under the age of 18, 8.7% from 18 to 24, 29.6% from 25 to 44, 19.8% from 45 to 64, and 16.6% who were 65 years of age or older. The median age was 35 years. For every 100 females, there were 82.0 males. For every 100 females age 18 and over, there were 78.4 males.

The median income for a household in the village was $28,289, and the median income for a family was $31,898. Males had a median income of $28,750 versus $20,438 for females. The per capita income for the village was $13,580. About 14.2% of families and 20.6% of the population were below the poverty line, including 29.4% of those under age 18 and 24.7% of those age 65 or over.

Village Government 
The Village of Oak Hill, OH is governed by an elected six member council. The present mayor is Paul McNeal.
As of 2020, The Council Members are:
Council President - Jennifer Hughes
Council Member - Terry McCain
Council Member - David A. Ward
Council Member - Jody Fulk
Council Member - Steven Campbell
Council Member - James G. Coleman
Fiscal Officer - Susan King
Chief of Police - David P. Ward

Landmarks 
The Welsh museum is the only one of its kind in the United States and houses Welsh books, bibles, documents, pictures, and a collection of other Welsh items. The museum is maintained by Mildred Bangert. The Welsh-American Heritage Museum  is located in the old Welsh Congregational Church in Oak Hill.

Jackson Lake is a man-made lake, in Lake Jackson State Park, near the city limits of Oak Hill. The park is the home of the Jefferson Furnace, in which pig iron for the ironclad USS Monitor was made during the Civil War. The Jefferson Furnace is available to sightseers .  The furnace is located at the edge of the lake on State Route 279.

References

External links
 Oak Hill Area Chamber of Commerce
 Oak Hill Local Union School District

Villages in Ohio
Villages in Jackson County, Ohio
Welsh-American culture in Ohio